The Västgöta Nation, or locally VG's, is one of thirteen student nations at Lund University in Sweden.

The nation traces its history to 1669. It was originally intended to be for students from the Västergötland province in Sweden. Among the first decrees was a prohibition on discussions, making it clear that it was a social society for relaxation and leisure.

With the ensuing Scanian War from 1676 to 1682, the nation's activities were halted, and not re-established until 1685. Since 1685, its traditions have followed an unbroken succession, although it was merged with Östgöta Nation and Kalmar Nation between 1767 and 1821 as a result of low student numbers at the university.

Today the nation has 1,800 members out of the university's 34,000 students.

This nation is commonly referred to as a restaurant and bar, as well as a night club; it is one of many venues to host "" (formal dinners) and events. The entire nation is student-run and provides national and international students the opportunity to work as chefs, apprentices, wait staff, and bartenders.

References

External links
 Västgöta Nation - Official site

Nations at Lund University